Lake Beloye (Śutkül;  — literally White lake) is a lake in Yalchiksky District of Chuvashia, Russia. It is a karst lake.

External links 
 Çутă кӳлĕ вăрттăнлăхĕ 

Lakes of Chuvashia